Gilbert Carson (1842 – 4 March 1924) was an independent conservative Member of Parliament in New Zealand.

Biography

Carson was born at sea in 1842 two weeks before the ship reached Auckland. He was a Mayor of Wanganui for three consecutive terms.

He was elected to the Wanganui electorate in the 1896 general election, and was defeated in 1899.

In 1914, he was appointed to the Legislative Council and served one term until 1921.

Carson owned and edited the Wanganui Chronicle. He had bought the newspaper in 1874.

Carson died on 4 March 1924.

Notes

References

1842 births
1924 deaths
Members of the New Zealand House of Representatives
Mayors of Wanganui
Members of the New Zealand Legislative Council
Unsuccessful candidates in the 1890 New Zealand general election
Unsuccessful candidates in the 1899 New Zealand general election
Unsuccessful candidates in the 1887 New Zealand general election
New Zealand MPs for North Island electorates
19th-century New Zealand politicians
People born at sea